Three ships of the British Royal Navy have been named HMS Iron Duke  after Arthur Wellesley, 1st Duke of Wellington, nicknamed the "Iron Duke". The name is also a pun, as the first ship so named was an ironclad.

  was a battleship launched in 1870, paid off in 1893, converted to as a coal hulk, and sold 1906 for scrap
  was the name-ship of a class of battleships, launched in 1912 and sold in 1946 for scrap. She is most famous for being the fleet flagship at the Battle of Jutland.
  is a Type 23 frigate launched in 1991

Battle honours
Ships named Iron Duke have earned the following battle honours:
Jutland, 1916

See also
 , another ship named after the first Duke of Wellington.
 
 

Royal Navy ship names